The Satellite Award for Best Actor in a Television Series – Drama is one of the annual awards given by the International Press Academy.

Winners and nominees

1990s

2000s

2010s

2020s

References

External links	
 Official website

Actor Television Series Drama
Television awards for Best Actor